Etchojoa Municipality is a municipality in Sonora in north-western Mexico. As of 2010, the municipality had a total population of 60,717.

References

Municipalities of Sonora